Three referendums were held in Slovenia on 5 June 2011, the so-called super-referendum Sunday. The questions asked were:
 one on the reform of the pension system (the proposed revision would have raised the retirement age to 65 years, lowered the replacement rate on pensions and changed the way pensioners are able to access their second-pillar retirement savings);
 on opening secret service archives; and
 on stronger measures to combat illicit work.

All three measures were decisively defeated at medium turnout.

References

2011 referendums
2011
2011 in Slovenia
Pension referendums
June 2011 events in Europe